Joe Furey is an American Emmy Award and Writers Guild Award nominated writer, producer and comedian.  His credits include Late Night with David Letterman, Newsradio, Watching Ellie, and Talkshow with Spike Feresten, as well as the feature film Love and Support, in which he also starred.

Furey has also worked as a consulting producer and writer on the TV series Important Things with Demetri Martin (Comedy Central, 2009), Rob (CBS, 2012) The Soul Man (TV Land, 2012), Divorce (HBO, 2016), and What We Do in the Shadows (FX, 2019). 

He edited the 1993 short film Through an Open Window, which was screened in the Un Certain Regard section at the 1992 Cannes Film Festival.

He was Associate Producer on the feature Dean (film), a 2016 American film starring Demetri Martin.

References

External links

 http://www.loveandsupportthemovie.com/
 http://movies.netflix.com/Movie/Love_and_Support/70108215
 https://www.youtube.com/watch?v=_V8cefmEhf4

Living people
American male comedians
21st-century American comedians
American television writers
American male television writers
American television producers
Year of birth missing (living people)
Place of birth missing (living people)
21st-century American screenwriters
21st-century American male writers